Angus Trevor Bennett (born September 3, 1926) is a Canadian politician in Newfoundland and Labrador. He served in the Newfoundland and Labrador House of Assembly for St. Barbe from 1979 to 1982 as a member of the Liberal Party of Newfoundland and Labrador. He was the son of Angus and Myra Bennett, from Daniel's Harbour, Newfoundland and Labrador. His mother was a notable nurse, dubbed "The Florence Nightingale of Newfoundland". Their home in Daniel's Harbor, Bennett House, is a Registered Heritage Structure in the province. Bennett was educated in Daniel's Harbour and was a businessman. He married Mildred Jane Field in 1952 and has four children.

References

1926 births
Living people